Gushk may refer to:
 Gushk Bala
 Gushk Pain

See also
 Kushk (disambiguation)